Robert Lackey was an American football coach.  He served as the second head football coach at the University of Illinois at Urbana–Champaign, coaching for one season in 1891 and compiling a record of 6–0.

Head coaching record

References

Year of birth missing
Year of death missing
Illinois Fighting Illini football coaches